Relations between Romania and the United States were formally established in 1880, with the appointment of Eugene Schuyler, a renowned and talented diplomat and historian, as the first American diplomatic representative to Romania. After Romania left the Eastern Bloc in 1989, US-Romanian relations have matured into a strategic partnership that encompasses a wide range of political, military, economic and cultural issues. The US supported Romania's entry into NATO, setting the stage for further integration into Europe. Today, Romania is a strong ally of the United States, and the two countries work together to build democracy, fight terrorism, and promote regional security and stability.

In addition to close historical and cultural ties, Romania is one of the most consistently pro-American nations in Europe and in the world. According to a 2018 European poll, 78% of Romanians view the United States favorably. This is the second-highest pro-American sentiment in the European Union, after Poland. Another poll showed that a very large percentage of Romanians, 87%, want future US ambassadors to Bucharest to continue supporting the fight against corruption in Romania. The same poll showed that 74% of Romanians want the United States to remain the main strategic partner of Romania.

History 
The United States established diplomatic relations with Romania in 1880, following Romania's independence. 

On June 5, 1942, in the midst of World War II, the United States declared war on Axis-aligned Romania, in response to Romania having declared war on the United States on December 12 of the previous year. The US declared war on Hungary and Bulgaria the same day. The declaration of war passed both houses of Congress unanimously, by votes of 361–0 in the House of Representatives and 73–0 in the Senate.

Relations remained strained during the Cold War era while Romania was under communist influence.
US bilateral relations with Romania began to improve in the early 1960s with the signing of an agreement providing for partial settlement of American property claims. Cultural, scientific, and educational exchanges were initiated, and in 1964 the legations of both nations were promoted to full embassies.

After Communist Party general secretary Nicolae Ceaușescu began to distance Romania from Soviet foreign policy, as in Romania's continued diplomatic relations with Israel and denunciation of the 1968 Soviet invasion of Czechoslovakia, President Richard Nixon paid an official visit to Romania in August 1969. Despite political differences, diplomacy continued between US and Romanian leaders throughout the 1970s, culminating in the 1978 state visit to Washington by President Ceauşescu and his wife.

In 1972, a consular convention to facilitate the protection of citizens and their property in both countries was signed. Overseas Private Investment Corporation (OPIC) facilities were granted, and Romania became eligible for US Export-Import Bank credits.

A trade agreement signed in April 1975 accorded most favored nation (MFN) status to Romania under section 402 of the Trade Reform Act of 1974 (the Jackson-Vanik amendment that links MFN to a country's performance on emigration). This status was renewed yearly after a congressional review confirmed a presidential determination that stated Romania was making progress toward freedom of emigration.

In the mid-1980s, criticism of Romania's deteriorating human rights record, particularly regarding the mistreatment of religious and ethnic minorities, spurred attempts by Congress to withdraw MFN status. In 1988, to preempt congressional action, Ceausescu renounced MFN treatment, calling Jackson-Vanik and other human rights requirements unacceptable interference in Romanian sovereignty.

After welcoming the revolution of December 1989 with a visit by Secretary of State Baker in February 1990, the US Government expressed concern that opposition parties had faced discriminatory treatment in the May 1990 elections, in which the National Salvation Front won a sweeping victory. The slow progress of subsequent political and economic reform increased that concern, and relations with Romania declined sharply after the June 1990 Mineriad, where an anti-NSF sit-in was suppressed by Romanian police. Anxious to cultivate better relationships with the US and Europe, and disappointed at the poor results from its gradualist economic reform strategy, the Stolojan government implemented economic reform and conducted free and fair parliamentary and presidential elections in September 1992. Encouraged by the conduct of local elections in February 1992, US Deputy Secretary of State Lawrence Eagleburger visited in May 1992. Congress restored MFN in November 1993 in recognition of Romania's progress in instituting political and economic reform. In 1996, the US Congress voted to extend permanent MFN graduation to Romania.

As Romania's policies became unequivocally pro-Western, the United States moved to deepen relations. President Bill Clinton visited Bucharest in 1997. The two countries initiated cooperation on shared goals, including economic and political development, defense reform, and non-traditional threats (such as trans-border crime and non-proliferation).

Following the events of September 11, 2001, Romania was fully supportive of the US in the Global War on Terror. Romania was part of the American-led "Coalition of the Willing" that supported the invasion of Iraq in 2003. Romania was invited to join the North Atlantic Treaty Organization (NATO) in November 2002 and formally joined NATO on March 29, 2004, after depositing its instruments of treaty ratification in Washington, D.C. President George W. Bush helped commemorate Romania's NATO accession when he visited Bucharest in November 2002. On that occasion, he congratulated the Romanian people on building democratic institutions and a market economy after the fall of communism. Romanian troops still serve alongside US troops in Afghanistan and were among the last to withdraw from Iraq.

In March 2005, President Traian Băsescu made his first official visit to Washington to meet with President Bush, Secretary of State Condoleezza Rice, Secretary of Defense Donald Rumsfeld, and other senior US officials. In December 2005, Secretary Rice visited Bucharest to meet with President Băsescu and to sign a bilateral defense cooperation agreement that would allow for the joint use of Romanian military facilities by US troops. The first proof of principle exercise took place at Mihail Kogălniceanu Air Base from August to October 2007.

Romania formally terminated its mission in Iraq on June 4, 2009, and pulled out its troops. On July 23, the last Romanian soldiers left Iraq. Three Romanian soldiers had been killed during their mission, and at least eight were wounded.

In 2011, the United States and Romania issued the "Joint Declaration on Strategic Partnership for the 21st Century Between the United States of America and Romania." The two countries identified key areas for enhanced cooperation, focusing on their political-military relationship, law-enforcement cooperation, trade and investment opportunities, and energy security. The United States and Romania are mutually committed to supporting human rights, strengthening the rule of law, and increasing prosperity in both countries. Romania and the United States also have ties in the form of business, arts and academic programs, including the Future Leaders Exchange (FLEX) for high school students and a Fulbright program managed by the bilateral Fulbright Commission. Romania's promotion of greater cooperation among its Black Sea neighbors in the areas of defense, law enforcement, energy, economic development, and the environment complements the US goal of enhancing stability in this sensitive and vital region.

In October 2013, the Romanian Government allowed the United States military to use a Romanian base for US troop withdrawal from Afghanistan.

Economic relations
Following the 1989 revolution, Romania's economy began to transition from state control to capitalism. The country worked to create a legal framework consistent with a market economy and investment promotion. Romania became a member of the European Union in 2007. In 1992, the United States and Romania signed a bilateral investment treaty (BIT), which came into force in 1994. In 2003, before Romania's accession to the EU, the United States and Romania amended the BIT, which remains in effect. Romania attracts US investors interested in accessing the European market, with relatively low costs and a well-educated, tech-savvy population being major draws. In Romania, major US firms operate in the energy, manufacturing, information technology and telecommunications, services, and consumer products sectors. Top Romanian exports to the United States include machinery, vehicle parts, steel, and metallic items, and fertilizers.

Resident diplomatic missions
of Romania in the United States
Embassy (1): Washington, D.C.
 Consulate General (5): Chicago, Los Angeles, New York City, Miami, Houston
 Honorary Consulate General (1): Atlanta
 Consulate Honorary (17): Boston, Cleveland, Dallas, Detroit, Hartford, Indianapolis, Las Vegas, Minneapolis, New Orleans, Norfolk, Norman, Philadelphia, Portland, Phoenix, Sarasota, San Francisco, Sacramento
of United States in Romania
Embassy (1): Bucharest

U.S military assistance to Romania

99th Military Base Deveselu

The Romanian Air Force 91st Air Base was closed in 2003, forcing approximately 200 personnel into early retirement; about 15 still live in the commune in the "airmen neighborhood".

The airbase near Deveselu was selected for the NATO missile defense system employing Aegis Ashore Ballistic Missile Defense System and the inauguration ceremony was held in December 2015. The system uses the SM-3 Block I.B. interceptor. There are about 500 Romanian soldiers, 250 U.S. troops, and other personnel working at the base.

On 29 April 2022, a ceremony was held at the base with the occasion of the 10th anniversary of its establishment. On this occasion, the military colours of the 99th Military Base Deveselu were decorated with the Order of Military Virtue.

57th Air Base Mihail Kogălniceanu

The base has been used by the US Military since 1999. In 2003, it became one of four Romanian military facilities that have been used by US military forces as a staging area for the invasion of and ongoing counter-insurgency efforts in Iraq, operated by the 458th Air Expeditionary Group. It was intended to become one of the main operating bases of United States Army Europe 's Joint Task Force East (JTF-E), a rotating task force initially to be provided by the US 2nd Cavalry Regiment, which was to grow to a brigade-sized force eventually. The JTF-E concept has been reduced to the Army-only Task Force East, but the base still retains an important role, given added weight by the 2014 Crimean crisis.

During the first three months of the 2003 invasion of Iraq, the airport was transited by 1,300 cargo and personnel transports towards Iraq, comprising 6,200 personnel and about 11,100 tons of equipment.

High-level mutual visits

See also
 
Foreign relations of Romania
Foreign relations of the United States
Flaviu Vasile, Rus, ed., "The cultural and diplomatic relations between Romania and the United States of America. 1880-1920", Cluj-Napoca, MEGA Publishing, 2018.
List of Romanian ambassadors to the United States
Romanian Americans
Romanian Greek Catholic Church
Romanian-American organizations
Romanian-American University

References

External links
 History of Romania - US relations

 
Bilateral relations of the United States
United States